Agency is a city in Wapello County, Iowa, United States. The population was 620 at the 2020 census. It is the historic site of an Indian trading post and the grave of Chief Wapello.

History
An Indian agency was established here in 1838 and operated until the local tribes were moved to Kansas.  The town was founded on the site of the agency in 1843 and incorporated in 1859.

Agency is the resting place for Chief Wapello. Chief Wapello was second in command in the Sac and Fox tribe, just under Chief Keokuk. Chief Wapello is buried next to his good friend General Joseph M. Street, and his family. 

On April 11, 2001, an F2 tornado ripped through Agency destroying or damaging dozens of structures.  Two people were killed and three others injured.

Geography
Agency is located at  (40.995432, -92.307532).

Demographics

2010 census
As of the census of 2010, there were 638 people, 277 households, and 189 families living in the city. The racial makeup of the city was 97.6% White, 1.3% Native American, 0.2% from other races, and 0.9% from two or more races. Hispanic or Latino of any race were 2.4% of the population.

There were 277 households, of which 27.8% had children under the age of 18 living with them, 54.2% were married couples living together, 8.7% had a female householder with no husband present, 5.4% had a male householder with no wife present, and 31.8% were non-families. 27.8% of all households were made up of individuals, and 12.7% had someone living alone who was 65 years of age or older. The average household size was 2.30 and the average family size was 2.75.

The median age in the city was 44.6 years. 20.4% of residents were under the age of 18; 7% were between the ages of 18 and 24; 22.9% were from 25 to 44; 27.2% were from 45 to 64; and 22.3% were 65 years of age or older. The gender makeup of the city was 48.9% male and 51.1% female.

2000 census
As of the census of 2000, there were 622 people, 272 households, and 178 families living in the city. The racial makeup of the city was 99.20% White, 0.16% African American, 0.48% Asian, 0.16% from other races. Hispanic or Latino of any race were 0.80% of the population.

There were 272 households, out of which 23.9% had children under the age of 18 living with them, 58.5% were married couples living together, 5.9% had a female householder with no husband present, and 34.2% were non-families. 31.6% of all households were made up of individuals, and 17.6% had someone living alone who was 65 years of age or older. The average household size was 2.29 and the average family size was 2.89.

Age spread: 22.5% under the age of 18, 5.1% from 18 to 24, 26.0% from 25 to 44, 24.3% from 45 to 64, and 22.0% who were 65 years of age or older. The median age was 43 years. For every 100 females, there were 92.0 males. For every 100 females age 18 and over, there were 84.7 males.

The median income for a household in the city was $36,912, and the median income for a family was $44,306. Males had a median income of $29,107 versus $26,750 for females. The per capita income for the city was $16,896. About 2.2% of families and 5.3% of the population were below the poverty line, including 8.7% of those under age 18 and 5.9% of those age 65 or over.

References

Cities in Iowa
Cities in Wapello County, Iowa
Populated places established in 1838
1838 establishments in Iowa Territory